The 2006 Baylor Bears football team (variously "Baylor", "BU", or the "Bears") represented Baylor University during the 2006 NCAA Division I FBS football season. They were represented in the Big 12 Conference in the South Division. They played their home games at Floyd Casey Stadium in Waco, Texas. They were coached by head coach Guy Morriss.

Schedule

References

Baylor
Baylor Bears football seasons
Baylor Bears football